Hayashiechthistatus inexpectus is a species of beetle in the family Cerambycidae, and the only species in the genus Hayashiechthistatus. It was described by Hayashi in 1959.

References

Phrissomini
Beetles described in 1959